Virtuality is the quality of having the attributes of something without sharing its (real or imagined) physical form.

Virtuality also may refer to:

Technology 

Virtuality (gaming), a family of virtual reality arcade machines
Virtuality (software design), a concept of software design proposed by Ted Nelson
Reality–virtuality continuum, a concept in computer science
Augmented virtuality, the merging of real-world objects into virtual worlds
Real Virtuality, a proprietary computer game engine developed by Bohemia Interactive

Other 
Virtuality (philosophy)
Virtuality (song), by Rush
"Virtuality", a song by VBirds
Virtuality (film), a pilot for a science-fiction TV show that was ultimately not commissioned

See also 
 Virtual (disambiguation)